The Diocese of Tarazona (Latin, Turiasonensis) is a Roman Catholic bishopric located in north-eastern Spain, in the provinces of Zaragoza, Soria, Navarre and
La Rioja, forming part of the autonomous communities of Aragón, Castile-Leon, Navarre and La Rioja. The diocese forms part of the ecclesiastical province of Zaragoza, and is thus suffragan to the Archdiocese of Zaragoza.

Episcopal see
The city of Tarazona is situated on a commanding point, surrounded by a beautiful open plain, through which the river Queiles flows.

Cathedral

The Church of the Magdalene was the ancient cathedral, but the Moors, objecting to its prominent position, compelled them to use a church on the outskirts of the town. In the records left by Miguel this was variously called Santa Maria de la Hidria, de la Vega, or de la Huerta, on account of its position. It was endowed by Teresa Cajal, mother of Pedro de Atarés and wife of García Sánchez, and was begun in 1152. 

Architecturally, it is a combination of Byzantine and Gothic, with a high portico entrance and a high brick-trimmed tower. The centre nave with its pointed arches rises above the side aisles and merges into a spacious transept. In the windows Gothic gives place to Plateresque, but in the side chapels dedicated to St. Lawrence, St. Andrew, the Rosary, St. Peter, the Beheading of St. John the Baptist, the Annunciation, St. Elizabeth of Portugal, the Purification and St. James the Great, Gothic prevails in the reredos and tombs. 

Bishop Moncada attempted to rebuild the beautiful cloister which had been destroyed in the War of the Two Peters, but as late as 1529 this had not been completed.

Other churches

Besides the Church of the Magdalene, the Church of St. Michael, with its simple Gothic nave, and that of the Conception nuns, are also notable.

The Church of St. Francis is said to have been founded by Saint Francis of Assisi himself in 1214, and Francisco Jiménez de Cisneros was consecrated archbishop of Toledo in the Chapel of La Piedad in 1495.

The episcopal palace, the ancient Azuda, is built upon a commanding eminence and has a beautiful view. Bishop Pedro Pérez Calvillo purchased this from the Aragonese governor, Jordán Pérez de Urries, in 1386, and entailed it to the bishopric.

The diocesan seminary, dedicated to St. Gaudiosus, was founded in 1593 by Bishop Pedro Cerbuna. It has recently been extensively renovated.

Mention should be made of the monastery of Nuestra Señora de Veruela, a Cistercian abbey founded by Pedro de Atarés, and now a Jesuit novitiate; also of the Church of Borja, ranking as a collegiate church since the time of Pope Nicholas V (1449), favoured and protected by Pope Alexander VI; and of the ancient collegiate church of Calatayud, Santa Maria de Mediavilla, whose priors ranked as mitred deans.

History

Roman period
Turiaso was one of the principal towns of the ancient Celtiberian province, and within the confines of the diocese are found many very ancient cities: Bilbilis (Calatayud); Aquae Bilbilitanorum (Alhama); Atacum (Ateca); Augustobriga (Muro); Boverca (Buvierca); Bursao (Borja); Cascantum (Cascante); Gracuris (Corella); Monóbriga (Munébrega); and Vergegium (Verdejo). Pliny the Elder numbers Tarazona among the principal cities of the Celtiberians, and its inhabitants had the privileges of citizenship. Its coat of arms bore the motto "Tubal-Cain built me and Hercules rebuilt me".

Nothing definite is known of the origin of Christianity in Tarazona. Owing to its proximity to Saragossa it is supposed that it was visited at an early date by the disciples of Saint James the Great, but until the 5th century there is no reliable mention of a bishop of Tarazona.

Visigoth period (5th to 7th centuries)
The chronicler Idatius names Leo as bishop in 449; the chronological list of bishops gives St. Prudentius, but the history of this saint is uncertain. The Tarazona Breviary gives 390 as his date, but other sources place him as late as the 9th century. Idatius says that Leo was killed in an uprising led by a certain Basilius where the Bagandae took refuge in the cathedral, and in which a great number were killed.

St. Gaudiosus, a former monk of the Monastery of Asanense and a disciple of St. Victorian(us), was bishop in 530. He worked against the Arians, and died in his native city, Escoron. His remains were translated to the Monastery of Asanense, and King Sancho Ramirez had them removed to Montearagón.

St. Braulius, in his life of St. Emilianus, speaks of a Didymus, Bishop of Tarazona. A Bishop Stephen assisted at the Third Council of Toledo (589) and at the Second Council of Zaragoza (592); Floridius assisted at the Council of Gundemar (611); Elpidius, at the Fourth and Fifth Council of Toledo (633 and 636); Antherius (683) sent a deacon to represent him at the Thirteenth Council of Toledo (683); and Nepotianus assisted at the Fifteenth and Seventeenth Council of Toledo (688 and 694). He seems to have been the last bishop of the Visigothic epoch.

Moorish period (early 8th century – 1119)
When the Moors took Tarazona they were able to hold it for a long time on account of its fortified position near the Sierra del Moncayo, between the Douro and the Ebro rivers. The names of its Mozarabic bishops have not come down to us, although it is very probable there were such; on the other hand we know of the Mozarabic saints, St. Attilanus, Bishop of Zamora and St. Iñigo of Calatayud.

After the Reconquest (1119–today)
King Alfonso I the Battler of Aragon took possession of Tarazona in 1119, and named Miguel Cornel as bishop. King Alfonso VII of Castile, in an effort to get possession of Tarazona, intruded a certain de Bujedo into the see; but de Bujedo repented shortly afterwards, restored the see to its rightful owner, Miguel, and retired to the Monastery of Valpuesta.

The Council of Burgos, which was convened in 1139, and was presided over by the legate Guido, took from the jurisdiction of Tarazona most of the towns of Soria, but bestowed in its place the Archdeaconry of Calatayud.

Miguel Cornel was the real restorer of the see. He governed for thirty-three years (1118–1151), and established the chapters of Tarazona, Calatayud, and Tudela, under the Rule of St. Augustine. In his time also were founded the Monasteries of Fitero and Veruela.

Three bishops of the name of Frontin succeeded him: Juan (1173–1194); Garcia, who was present at the battle of Las Navas de Tolosa (1212), and Garcia II, the counsellor of James the Conqueror (el Conquistador). In a species of national council held at Tarazona, the marriage of James to Leonor of Castile was declared null on account of the relationship existing between them. The Franciscans, Mercedarians, Dominicans, and Trinitarians, and the Cistercian and Poor Clare nuns were established in the diocese at this time.

Miguel Jiménez de Urrea, bishop from 1309 to 1316, was protected by king James II of Aragon, and during the time of Pedro Pérez Calvillo the war between Pedro IV the Ceremonious (el Ceremonioso) of Aragon and Pedro the Cruel of Castile took place. Tarazona was laid waste and its cathedral desecrated by the Castilians. The episcopal palace was burned, and la Zuda, sometimes also called Alcázar de Hércules, the palace of the Arab governors, was taken to replace it.

Bishops of Tarazona
 ca. 449 : : Leo — (Mentioned in 449)
 ca. 516 : : Paul — (Mentioned in 516)
 527–541 : St. Gaudiosus
 ca. 560 : : Didymus — (Mentioned in 560)
 572–580 : St. Prudentius
 589–592 : Stephen
 ca. 610 : : Floridius — (Mentioned in 610)
 ca. 635 : : Elpidius — (Mentioned between 633 and 638)
 ca. 683 : : Antherius — (Mentioned in 683)
 ca. 690 : : Nepotianus — (Mentioned between 688 and 693)

8th to 11th centuries: Under Moorish rule.
 1118–1151 : Miguel Cornel
 1151–1169 : Martín Vergua
 1170–1172 : Berenguer
 1172–1194 : Juan Frontin
 1195–1218 : García Frontin I
 1219–1254 : García Frontin II
 --------- 1257 : Pedro I
 1258–1263 : García III
 --------- 1263 : Alfonso
 1270–1277 : Fortuño
 1280–1289 : García IV
 1289–1304 : Pedro II
 1305–1308 : Pedro III
 1309–1317 : Miguel Jiménez de Urrea
 1317–1321 : Pedro Arnau de Torres
 1324–1342 : Beltrán de Cornidela
 1343–1346 : Sancho López de Ayerbe
 1346–1352 : Gaufrido
 1354–1391 : Pedro Pérez Calvillo
 1391–1404 : Fernando Pérez Calvillo
 1404–1405 : Berenguer de Ribalta
 1405–1407 : Francisco Clemente Pérez Capera
 1407–1433 : Juan de Valtierra
 1435–1443 : Martín Cerdán
 1443–1463 : Jorge Bardají, or 1443–1464, son of an Aragonese magistrate.
 1464–1478 : Cardinal Pedro Ferriz, favourite of Popes Paul II and Sixtus IV.
 1478–1495 : Andrés Martínez Ferriz
 1496–1521 : Guillermo Ramón de Moncada — (or Guillén Ramón de Moncada)
 1523–1535 : Gabriel de Ortí
 1537–1546 : Hércules Gonzaga — (son of Francesco II Gonzaga, Marquis of Mantua).
 1546–1567 : Juan González de Munébrega
 1567–1572 : See vacant
 1572–1574 : Pedro Martínez de Luna
 1577–1584 : Juan de Redín y Cruzat
 1585–1597 : Pedro Cerbuna, founder of the seminary and of the University of Zaragoza.
 1599–1613 : Diego de Yepes
 1614–1630 : Martín Terrer de Valenzuela
 1630–1631 : Pedro de Herrera
 1631–1642 : Baltasar de Navarra y Arroytia
 1644–1655 : Diego Castejón Fonseca
 1656–1659 : Pedro Manero
 1660–1664 : Diego Escolano y Ledesma
 1664–1673 : Miguel Escartín
 1673–1682 : Diego Francés de Urritigoyti y Lerma
 1683–1700 : Bernardo Mateo Sánchez de Castellar
 1701–1718 : Blas Serrate
 1720–1741 : García Pardiñas Villar de Francos
 1741–1755 : José Alcaraz y Belluga
 1755–1766 : Esteban Vilanova Colomer
 1766–1795 : José Laplana y Castellón
 1795–1802 : Damián Martínez de Galinsoga
 1803–1814 : Francisco Porró y Reinado
 1815–1835 : Jerónimo Castellón y Salas, last Inquisitor General of Spain.
 1848–1852 : Vicente Ortíz y Labastida
 1855–1857 : Gil Esteve y Tomás
 1857–1888 : Cosme Marrodán y Rubio
 1889–1901 : Juan Soldevilla y Romero
 1902–1905 : José María Salvador y Barrera
 1905–1916 : Santiago Ozcoide y Udave
 1917–1926 : Isidoro Badía y Sarradell
 1927–1933 : Isidro Gomá y Tomás
 1935–1946 : Nicanor Mutiloa e Irurita
 1947–1966 : Manuel Hurtado y García
 1968–1971 : José Méndez Asensio
 1971–1973 : See vacant
 1973–1976 : Francisco Álvarez Martínez
 1976–1981 : Victorio Oliver Domingo
 1982–1989 : Ramón Búa Otero
 1990–1995 : Miguel José Asurmendi Aramendía
 1996–2004 : Joaquín Carmelo Borobia Isasa
 2004–2010 : Demetrio Fernandez Gonzalez; appointed Bishop of Cordoba, Spain
 2011–2022 : Eusebio Ignacio Hernández Sola
 2022–present : Vicente Rebollo Mozos

See also
 List of the Roman Catholic dioceses of Spain.

References

Sources and references
   1912: Tarazona ?fully
  IBERCRONOX: Obispado de Tarazona (Turiaso)

Tarazona
Tarazona